Calesia haemorrhoa, the gray-winged gibbon moth, is a moth of the family Noctuidae. It was first described by Achille Guenée in 1852. It is found in India and Sri Lanka. The forewings are a uniform grayish color. The head, femora, tibiae and abdomen are fringed with pinkish-orange hairs. Caterpillars are known to feed on Justicia wynaadensis, Justicia vasica, Barleria cristata and Eranthemum nervosum.

References

Moths of Asia
Moths described in 1852